Sangmu Shinhyup is a South Korean volleyball team founded in 1951. They played in V-League (2005–2012) and their home stadium was Seongnam Gymnasium in Seongnam.

Club honours
Club World Championship
5th place (1): 1992
Asian Club Championship
6th place (1): 2015

Notable players
 Shin Young-chul
 Shin Yung-suk

See also
Korea Armed Forces Athletic Corps

External links
 Official Website

Volleyball clubs established in 1951
1951 establishments in South Korea
Sport in Gyeonggi Province
South Korean volleyball clubs
Volleyball